WeSwap is a peer-to-peer currency exchange platform. WeSwap matches travellers heading in opposite directions and swaps their travel money directly. The London-based startup company was launched in 2013 by Jared Jesner and Simon Sacerdoti, and currently supports 18 different currencies around the world.

History
The WeSwap idea first stemmed from founder Jared Jesner's experiences as a city trader at JP Morgan: "I saw first hand the amazing rates that banks can change money at... but there was no way for consumers to access that same rate.". He went on to work for Royal Dutch Shell, where his exposure to the world of payments inspired the idea to partner with a prepaid card provider as the delivery mechanism for the service. At Shell, he was also introduced to corporate finance adviser Simon Sacerdoti, whose experience enabled them to start commercialising the idea and together they co-founded the service. At launch, the service supported 6 currencies. In 2014, WeSwap was serving customers from across 10 European countries and supported 18 currencies. In March 2018, WeSwap launched the ability to spend globally, anywhere the Mastercard symbol is accepted. This is alongside continuing to support 18 swappable currencies.

Investors
Seed funding came from a mixture of high net worth angel investors and super angels., including LoveFilm and Zoopla co-founder Alex Chesterman and Andy Murray. In October 2014, one year after launching, WeSwap secured another £4.5M in Series A funding. This was led and structured by IW Capital and supported by EC1 Capital along with the investors who had helped to raise £1.2M in seed funds.

Awards
In January 2015, WeSwap won the 'Innovation in Travel Award' at the Globe Travel Awards. Commercial director of Travelport, Paul Broughton, who presented the trophy said: "Our winner showed the most potential for disrupting its marketplace and changing how business is done." In March 2018, WeSwap won the Best Travel Money Provider at the British Bank Awards.

Collapse and Administration
In December 2021, WeSwap became a victim of the global collapse in travel following the Covid-19 pandemic and entered administration. WeSwap’s business and assets were sold in a pre-packaged administration sale to a third party, MKK Finance Limited, a subsidiary of the Blackthorn Finance Group. This pre-pack deal is expected to leave investors more than £20 million out of pocket.

See also
Financial technology

References

External links
Official website

Foreign exchange companies